Honeymoon Lane was a popular Broadway musical by Eddie Dowling, who wrote the book and also starred with music by James F. Hanley. The musical was a big success and ran for nearly a year from 20 September 1926 at the Knickerbocker Theatre on Broadway. Among the cast was Kate Smith. The play was made into a film of the same name with Dowling again starring in 1931.

Songs
“The Little White House (at the End of Honeymoon Lane)” was one of the biggest songs of 1927.

References

1926 musicals